Leslie John Griffiths, Baron Griffiths of Burry Port (born 15 February 1942) is a British Methodist minister, politician and life peer who served as President of the Methodist Conference from 1994 to 1995. A member of the Labour Party, he was an opposition spokesperson and whip in the House of Lords from 2017 to 2020.

Early life
Griffiths was born in Burry Port in Carmarthenshire, Wales, on 15 February 1942. He attended Llanelli Grammar School before studying at Cardiff University.

Early ministry and career

Griffiths became a local preacher in the Methodist Church of Great Britain in 1963. He completed a Master of Arts in Theology at Fitzwilliam College, Cambridge in 1969, while training for the ministry at Wesley House. He spent most of the 1970s serving the Methodist Church of Haiti, where he was ordained, before returning to Britain to serve in ministries in Caversham, Loughton, and Golders Green. In 1987 Griffiths completed a PhD from the School of Oriental and African Studies, University of London.

President and superintendent
In 1994, Griffiths became one of the few people to be elected President of the Methodist Conference whilst still a circuit minister. In this role he was the spiritual and administrative leader of the Methodists in Britain.

In 1996 he became superintendent minister at Wesley's Chapel, London.  He retired in 2017 and preached his last sermon on 6 August.  However,  he returned to take services at Loughton monthly during 2018, when the church there was between ministers. He was created Baron Griffiths of Burry Port, of Pembrey and Burry Port in the County of Dyfed in 2004.

On 20 August 2009, Griffiths published an article in the Methodist Recorder outlining a prospective plan for his "conditional ordination" by Richard Chartres, Bishop of London, in the Church of England. The plan was the subject of detailed discussion at the Methodist Conference (sitting in closed session) in 2008 and 2009 and the conference withheld consent for this move.

On 1 September 2011, Griffiths was appointed as the thirteenth president of the Boys' Brigade.

Arms

References

External links
Profile at Parliament of the United Kingdom
Wesley's Chapel
"Peerage for Revd Dr Leslie Griffiths" from The Methodist Church News Service
"What Can We Learn from the Methodist Church of Haiti" 

1942 births
Living people
Griffiths of Burry Port
People from Burry Port
Presidents of the Methodist Conference
Welsh Methodist ministers
Ordained peers
Alumni of Fitzwilliam College, Cambridge
Alumni of SOAS University of London
People educated at Llanelli Boys' Grammar School
Alumni of Wesley House
20th-century Welsh clergy
21st-century Welsh clergy
Life peers created by Elizabeth II